Leonard Francis Clark (January 6, 1907, United States – May 4, 1957, Venezuela) was an American explorer, writer, and OSS colonel.

He attended the University of California, Berkeley. During the Second World War he joined the army and then the Office of Strategic Services. He flew in China behind Japanese lines, organized guerrilla activity and espionage in China and Mongolia. He attained the rank of colonel.

After the war he organized mostly one-man expeditions in Borneo, Mexico, the Celebes, Sumatra, China, Tibet, India, Japan, Central America, South America, and Burma. He died on a diamond-mining expedition in Venezuela.

Leonard Clark was the writer of a number of successful books about his expeditions.

Works
A Wanderer Till I Die
The Marching Wind
The Rivers Ran East
Yucatan Adventure

Sources
Leonard Clark author profile on GoodReads
Leonard Clark author profile on Classic Travel Books

People of the Office of Strategic Services
1907 births
1957 deaths
American explorers
American travel writers
University of California, Berkeley alumni
20th-century American non-fiction writers
Deaths in Venezuela
United States Army personnel of World War II
Place of birth missing